The City is a 1994 Indian Malayalam-language action film directed by I. V. Sasi and written by T. Damodaran from a story by Priyadarsan. The cast includes Suresh Gopi, Urvashi, Lalu Alex, Ratheesh, Ahana and Anandaraj.

Plot

Assistant superintendent of police Raviprasad gets involved with a drug mafia when he tries to stop them.

Cast

Suresh Gopi as A.S.P Raviprasad
Urvashi as Jyothi
Ahana as Priya
Anandaraj as Raja
Ratheesh as Spark Jayadevan
Nizhalgal Ravi as Sudhakaran
Lalu Alex as Chandrasekharan Nair
Sindhuja as Maria Begum
Raveendran as Singer
Bindhu Panicker as Sumathi
Delhi Ganesh as Commissioner Muthalingam
Sridevi as Manju
Kalyan Kumar as R. S. Pandiyan
Sathyapriya as Thangamani
Kitty as Sharma
Vyjayanthi as Radhamani
Kuthiravattam Pappu as Govindan
Rajesh as Durai
Bobby Kottarakkara as Basheer
Raj Chander as Sharath
Dhadha Muthukumar as Rocky

References

External links

1994 films
1990s Malayalam-language films
Indian action films
Films about organised crime in India
Fictional portrayals of the Kerala Police
Films with screenplays by T. Damodaran
Films directed by I. V. Sasi